Gessa is a locality and decentralized municipal entity located in the municipality of Naut Aran, in Province of Lleida province, Catalonia, Spain. As of 2020, it has a population of 165.

Geography 
Gessa is located 170km north of Lleida.

References

Populated places in the Province of Lleida